Jerome W. Davis (January 5, 1924 – October 18, 2006) was a professional American football defensive back in the National Football League (NFL). He played for the Chicago Cardinals (1948–1951) and the Dallas Texans (1952).

References

1924 births
2006 deaths
American football defensive backs
Chicago Cardinals players
Dallas Texans (NFL) players
Southeastern Louisiana Lions football players
Players of American football from Savannah, Georgia
People from Covington, Louisiana
Players of American football from Louisiana